The 1909 The Citadel Bulldogs football team represented The Citadel as a member of the Southern Intercollegiate Athletic Association (SIAA) during the 1909 college football season. This was the fifth year of intercollegiate football at The Citadel, with Sam Costen serving as coach for the first season. The 1909 team was the first to be officially called the Bulldogs. The program played its first road game on November 3 against Davidson at the State Fairgrounds in Columbia, South Carolina. All other games are believed to have been played at Hampton Park at the site of the old race course.

Schedule

References

Citadel
The Citadel Bulldogs football seasons
Citadel Bulldogs football